Robert Wilson (born 29 May 1944) is an English retired amateur footballer who made one appearance in the Football League for Brentford as an inside forward. He is best remembered for his four seasons in non-League football with Hendon, for whom he made over 180 appearances.

Honours 
Hendon
 London Senior Cup: 1968–69

Career statistics

References

1944 births
English footballers
English Football League players
Brentford F.C. players
Living people
Footballers from Oxford
Association football inside forwards
Hayes F.C. players
Feltham F.C. (1946) players
Walton & Hersham F.C. players
Hendon F.C. players
Isthmian League players